Check is a 2021 Indian  Telugu-language prison drama film written and directed by Chandra Sekhar Yeleti. Produced by V. Anand Prasad's Bhavya Creations, the film stars Nithiin, Rakul Preet Singh, Priya Prakash Varrier (in her Telugu film debut), and Simran Choudhary. Nithiin plays Aditya, a chess player who is on death row. The film was released on 26 February 2021. It received generally mixed reviews and became a flop in the box office .

Plot
Aditya escapes from the orphanage along with his friend, who gets separated. He later works under a magician, learning every trick and gimmick he could. He grows up to be a con artist indulging in white-collar crimes. He befriends Yatra and falls for her. Yatra falsely frames him as a terrorist, and he ends up in a prison with a death sentence. He grows interest in chess and masters it in the prison under the guidance of Srimannarayana, a fellow inmate. He starts participating in National level competitions. Alongside this, he tries to prove his innocence and nullify his death penalty with the help of Manasa, a lawyer, but is not successful. He then tries for presidential pardon by becoming popular by playing chess where he wins the National level competition and enters Commonwealth games and wins the tournament. During the process of asking the president pardon, there is a terrorist attack that leads the president to turn down his petition. 

Just before his death sentence is carried out, he requests to play his final game with the chess grandmaster Viswanathan Anand as a last wish. During the game, he escapes from the prison, which he was planning from the start after meeting his childhood friend and the fellow inmate who helped him to learn chess. In the end, he narrates how he planned and escaped the prison after realising he wouldn’t be released from the prison even after getting the president’s pardon. He justifies his escape by claiming he is not guilty and will prove his innocence to the world.

Cast 
 Nithin as Aditya
 Rakul Preet Singh as Manasa 
 Priya Prakash Varrier as Yatra, whose real name is Isabel
Simran Choudhary as Varna, the fake witness 
 Sampath Raj as SP Rathnam
 Sai Chand as Srimannarayana
 Posani Krishna Murali as Lawyer Ramakrishna, Manasa's father
 Murali Sharma as SP Karunakar
 Harsha Vardhan as an astrologer
 Krishna Teja as Swami, Aditya's childhood friend
 Chaitanya Krishna as Ram, a Chess Champion
 Karthik Rathnam as Vikram
 Praveen Yandamuri as Vedha
 Raina Rao as Poojitha, State level chess player
 Aziz Naser as Jailguard Katamayya

Production 
The film was officially announced on 23 June 2019. Although principal photography began in early 2020, filming was paused due to COVID-19 lockdown in India. Filming was resumed in October 2020. The film's title was announced on 1 October 2020.

Soundtrack 
This film's soundtrack is composed by Kalyani Malik, marking his second collaboration with Yeleti after Aithe (2003).

The film's only song is "Ninnu Chudakunda Undalekapothunnanu", sung by Haricharan and Shakthisree Gopalan.

Release 
Check was released theatrically on 26 February 2021. It is later released in Streaming media via Sun NXT on 14 May 2021.

The film's Hindi dubbed version was premiered on Sony Max on 9 January 2022 and available on SonyLIV later released on YouTube by Aditya Movies on 25 January 2022.

Reception

Critical reception 
Check opened to mixed reviews. The Times of India critic Neeshita Nyayapati rated the film 2.5/5 and wrote, "Check has the potential to be an engaging prison drama but falters in portions it’s supposed to excel in." Hemanth Kumar in his review for Firstpost says, "For all the drama director Chandrasekhar Yeleti tries to create, the proceedings aren’t engaging enough and the protagonist's journey is lacklustre at best."

Sangeetha Devi of The Hindu opined that "Check might be one of Chandra Sekhar Yeleti’s weakest films." She felt that the narrative seemed shaky, and the story arc seemed predictable. On the technical aspects, Devi added that "Rahul Srivastav’s cinematography, Kalyani Malik’s background score, and the production design work well for the film." The Indian Express journalist Gabbeta Ranjith Kumar stated, "Despite its novel idea and some good performances, Nithiin-starrer starts resembling The Shawshank Redemption as it inches closer to the climax."

Box office 
Check grossed 14 crore in its opening weekend with a distributor share of 7 crore. By the end of its first week, it earned distributors a share of 9 crore.

References

External links 

 Watch Check Hindi dubbed on Sony liv 
 Watch Check hindi dubbed  on YouTube 
 Watch Check in Telugu on Jio Cinema

 Watch Check in Telugu on Sun NXT
 

2021 films
2020s Telugu-language films
Films shot in Hyderabad, India
Indian prison films
Prison drama films
2021 thriller drama films
Indian thriller drama films
2020s prison films